James Whyte Kelly (1855 – 15 December 1938) was a 19th-century New Zealand politician, initially of the Liberal Party but later an Independent Liberal.

Biography
Kelly was born in 1855 at Carluke, South Lanarkshire, Scotland. He became an orphan aged 14. He learned the trade of a tailor, and married Elizabeth Millar, the daughter of James Millar of Motherwell in Lanarkshire. The couple emigrated in 1875 on the Aldergrove to New Zealand, landing in Port Chalmers in Otago. They later moved south to Invercargill.

He represented the Invercargill electorate in the House of Representatives from 1890. He was in favour of land nationalisation and progressive taxes.

In 1895, he broke away from the Liberal Party and became an Independent Liberal. He was defeated in the 1899 election.

Kelly died on 15 December 1938.

References

1855 births
1938 deaths
New Zealand Liberal Party MPs
Members of the New Zealand House of Representatives
New Zealand MPs for South Island electorates
People from Carluke
Scottish emigrants to New Zealand
19th-century New Zealand politicians
Unsuccessful candidates in the 1899 New Zealand general election